Studio 5-B (also common known as Studio 5B) is an American drama series that aired on ABC from January 24 until February 5, 1989.
The series aired in its entirety in Britain on BBC2 in 1989.

Plot

Cast
 Kerrie Keane as Carla Montgomery
 Wendy Crewson as Gail Browning
 Kim Myers as Samantha Hurley
 Justin Deas as Jake Gallagher
 Kenneth David Gilman as David Chase
 George Grizzard as Douglas Hayward
 Jeffrey Tambor as Lionel Goodman

Episodes

References

External links
 
 Studio 5B at the TVGuide.com

1980s American drama television series
American Broadcasting Company original programming
1989 American television series debuts
1989 American television series endings
Television series by Warner Bros. Television Studios
English-language television shows
Television shows set in New York City
Television series about television